Speed Racer is a PlayStation game based on the television show of the same name. It was released by the company Jaleco (Tomy in Japan).

Gameplay
Speed Racer is an arcade type game that resembles Daytona USA. The major difference between the two games is the performance of the car and the fact that the player can use all the gadgets of the anime Mach 5. The gadgets can be used to "shunt" other cars (even with the Cutter, the cars only bounce and there is no damage), or take shortcuts by cutting down trees and driving underwater through lakes. The player switches over the gadgets and the camera views. The player can choose the length of the race in the menu, along with basic sound options and difficulty options.

In the options menu the player can watch a video that explains all the functionalities of the gadgets on the Mach 5.

Sound
The opening movie is the same as the anime, carrying the Japanese version's song. The North American version of the opening movie is the same as the English dub's opening. The game has music which can be listened to in the options menu.

Reception
Next Generation reviewed the game, rating it two stars out of five, and stated that "Overall, Speed Racer has a solid license covering up a racing experience we all played when we bought our PlayStations two years ago."

Reviews
GameFan Magazine (May, 1998)
Ação Games (Dec, 1996)
SuperGamePower (Jan, 1997)

References

External links
Speed Racer at UK GameSpot
Game Ranking

1996 video games
Jaleco games
Tomy games
PlayStation (console) games
PlayStation (console)-only games
Racing video games
Speed Racer video games
Video games developed in Japan